Monument–Lefebvre National Historic Site is an imposing rusticated sandstone building in Memramcook, New Brunswick. It was designated a National Historic Site of Canada in 1994 by the Historic Sites and Monuments Board of Canada, as a memorial to Father Camille Lefebvre who established Collège Saint-Joseph in 1864. The college and this building came to symbolize a resurgence of Acadian culture that began in the 19th century, one that continues through ongoing programs and displays. This cultural revival is commemorated by the site.

The college, which ceased operation in the 1960s, eventually became part of the Université de Moncton, and the surrounding grounds are now part of a resort and conference center. The site has featured exhibits about Acadian history since 1978. The current exhibit is titled "Reflections of a Journey—the Odyssey of the Acadian People".

External links
 https://www.monumentlefebvre.ca/fr/
 Town of Memramcook

Acadian history
Buildings and structures in Westmorland County, New Brunswick
National Historic Sites in New Brunswick
Museums in New Brunswick
Ethnic museums in Canada
Tourist attractions in Westmorland County, New Brunswick
Sandstone buildings in Canada